Martha Walters Barnett (born June 1, 1947) is an American attorney who served as the President of the American Bar Association from 2000 to 2001. She is now a partner at the Holland & Knight law firm.

Education 
Barnett earned her bachelor's degree from Tulane University, and she received her Juris Doctor from the University of Florida. In 2006, she was honored as a Distinguished Alumnus by the University of Florida.

Career 
After graduating from law school, Barnett became the first woman hired by Holland & Knight, where she served for the next 40 years. Barnett was selected as the president of the American Bar Association in 2000, and served alongside then-first lady Hillary Clinton on the inaugural ABA Commissionon Women in the Profession.

During Barnett's tenure as president of the ABA, the White House formally ended the practice of allowing the American Bar Association to pre-screen judicial nominees before they were officially announced. The ABA continues to maintain a rating system of federal judges and nominees.

Barnett was nominated to serve on the Florida Constitution Revision Commission by Governor Lawton Chiles and the Taxation and Budget Reform Commission by Governor Bob Martinez.

She was appointed by Florida Gov. Lawton Chiles to serve on the 1997-98 Florida Constitution Revision Commission.

Sources

1947 births
Living people
People from Dade City, Florida
Presidents of the American Bar Association
Tulane University alumni
Fredric G. Levin College of Law alumni
American women lawyers
American lawyers
Holland & Knight partners
21st-century American women